Atiquizaya is a municipality in the Ahuachapán department of El Salvador.

It covers an area of 66.64 km 2 and as of 2007 has a population of 33,587.

Cantons
It is divided into the following cantons:

El Chayal, Salitrero, Tapacún, Tortuguero, El Iscaquilío, Joya del Plantanar, Joya del Zapote, La Esperanza, Loma de Alarcón, Pepenance, San Juan El Espino, Santa Rita, Rincón Grande y Zunca.

Sports
The local football club is named C.D. Huracán and it currently plays in the Salvadoran Third Division.

Notable people
William Roberto Figueroa, footballer 
Judith Rivera, best CA ever

Municipalities of the Ahuachapán Department